Fantastic Mr. Fox is a 2009 American stop motion animated comedy film directed by Wes Anderson, who co-wrote the screenplay with Noah Baumbach. The project is based on the 1970 children's novel of the same name by Roald Dahl. George Clooney, Meryl Streep, Jason Schwartzman, Bill Murray, Willem Dafoe, and Owen Wilson star. The plot follows the titular character Mr. Fox (Clooney), as his spree of thefts results in his family, and later his community, being hunted down by three farmers known as Boggis (Robin Hurlstone), Bunce (Hugo Guinness), and Bean (Michael Gambon).

Development on the project began in 2004 as a collaboration between Anderson and Henry Selick (who worked with Anderson on the 2004 film The Life Aquatic with Steve Zissou) under Revolution Studios. In 2007, Revolution and Selick left for other projects; work on the film was moved to 20th Century Fox, where production began in 2007. Released in the United States on November 13, 2009, to critical acclaim, with praise for Anderson's direction, humor, and stop-motion animation. However, it underperformed at the box office, grossing just $46.5 million against a $40 million budget. The film received Academy Award nominations for Best Animated Feature and Best Original Score, losing both awards to Up.

Plot
While raiding Berk's Squab Farm, Mr. Fox triggers a fox trap caging himself along with his wife Felicity. Felicity reveals her pregnancy to her husband and pleads with him to find a safer job if they escape, and he agrees.

Two human years (12 fox years) later, the Foxes and their son Ash are living in a hole. Mr. Fox, now a newspaper columnist, moves the family into a better home inside a tree, ignoring the warnings of his lawyer, Clive Badger, about how dangerous the area is for foxes due to its proximity to facilities run by three farmers: Walt Boggis, Nate Bunce, and Frank Bean.

Soon after the Foxes move in, Felicity's nephew, Kristofferson Silverfox, comes to live with them due to his father receiving long-term medical treatment for double pneumonia. While Mr. and Mrs. Fox welcome him, Ash finds this situation intolerable, as his soft-spoken cousin is superior to him at almost everything and is charming everyone at his expense. Longing for his days as a thief, Mr. Fox and his opossum friend Kylie, the superintendent, steal produce and poultry from all three farms. They take Kristofferson along on the raids, which deepens Ash's resentment. Mr. Fox conceals these outings from Felicity, who becomes suspicious when unexplained food appears in their larder.

Angered by the raids, the farmers decide to kill Mr. Fox. They camp out near his home, and when Mr. Fox emerges, they open fire but only shoot off his tail. After demolishing the site of the tree while attempting to dig Mr. Fox out, they discover the Foxes have dug an escape tunnel. As the Foxes will have to surface for food and water, the farmers wait at the tunnel mouth. Underground, Felicity is upset that Mr. Fox returned to his thieving ways.

The group encounters Badger and many other local animal residents whose homes the farmers have also destroyed. As the animals begin fearing starvation, Mr. Fox calls them together and leads them on a digging expedition to tunnel to the three farms, stealing all of their prized goods. While the animals feast, Ash and Kristofferson begin to reconcile after Kristofferson defends Ash from Beaver's son. The cousins slip away from the celebration and return to Bean's farm, intending to reclaim the missing tail, but Bean's wife captures Kristofferson.

Discovering that Mr. Fox has stolen their goods, the farmers and the fire chief flood the animals' tunnel network with some of Bean's cider, forcing the animals to retreat to the sewers. Realizing that the farmers plan to use Kristofferson to lure him into an ambush, Mr. Fox heads to the surface to surrender but returns when Rat, Bean's violent security guard, confronts the animals and attacks Ash and Felicity. A fight between Mr. Fox and Rat results in the latter being pushed into a generator, electrocuting him. Before dying, Rat reveals that Kristofferson is being held in an attic on Bean's farm, prompting Mr. Fox to organize a rescue mission.

Mr. Fox asks the farmers for a meeting in town near the sewer hub, offering to surrender himself on the condition that the farmers free Kristofferson and spare the other animals. The farmers prepare an ambush, but the animals, anticipating it, launch a counterattack that allows Mr. Fox, Ash, and Kylie to enter Bean's farm undetected. Ash frees Kristofferson and impresses his father and the group by braving enemy fire to release a rabid beagle to keep the farmers at bay. The animal snatches the fox tail from Mr. Bean and rips it apart. Kristofferson picks up the torn tail as the group escapes back to the sewers.

As the farmers wait for the animals to come out of the hole, the animals settle into their new homes in the sewers, inviting any other animals to join them. Soon after, Fox (sporting the tail as a clip on) raids a grocery store owned by the farmers, where Felicity reveals her upcoming pregnancy as the animals dance in the aisle, celebrating their abundant new food source.

Cast

 George Clooney as Mr. Fox
 Meryl Streep as Mrs. Felicity Fox
 Jason Schwartzman as Ash Fox
 Bill Murray as Clive Badger Esq.
 Willem Dafoe as Rat
 Michael Gambon as Frank Bean
 Owen Wilson as Coach Skip
 Wallace Wolodarsky as Kylie
 Eric Chase Anderson as Kristofferson Silverfox
 Jarvis Cocker as Petey
 Wes Anderson as Stan Weasel
 Robin Hurlstone as Walt Boggis
 Hugo Guinness as Nate Bunce
 Helen McCrory as Mrs. Bean
 Juman Malouf as Agnes
 Karen Duffy as Linda Otter
 Roman Coppola as Squirrel Contractor
 Garth Jennings as Bean's son
 Brian Cox as Daniel Peabody
 Steven Rales as Beaver
 Jeremy Dawson as Beaver's Son
 James Hamilton as Phil Mole
 Jennifer Furches as Dr. Badger
 Mario Batali as Rabbit
 Allison Abbate as Rabbit's ex-girlfriend
 Molly Cooper as Rabbit Girl
 Adrien Brody as Mouse
 Martin Ballard as Fire chief

Production

Development
Joe Roth and Revolution Studios bought the film rights to Fantastic Mr Fox in 2004. In 2006, Mark Mothersbaugh stated that he was working on the soundtrack. Wes Anderson signed on as director with Henry Selick, who worked with Anderson on The Life Aquatic with Steve Zissou, as animation director. Anderson stated that he signed on because Roald Dahl was one of his heroes. Originally, Cate Blanchett was to voice Mrs. Fox, but she left the role for undisclosed reasons.

The story the novel covers would amount to the second act of the film. Anderson added new scenes to serve for the film's beginning and end. The new scenes precede Mr. Fox's plan to steal from the three farmers and follow the farmers' bulldozing of the hill, beginning with the flooding of the tunnel. Selick left the project, to work on the Neil Gaiman story Coraline in February 2006. He was replaced by Mark Gustafson. 20th Century Fox became the project's home in October 2006 after Revolution left for other projects.

In September 2007, Anderson announced voice work would begin.
The director chose to record the voices outside rather than in a studio: "we went out in a forest, ... went in an attic, [and] went in a stable. We went underground for some things. There was a great spontaneity in the recordings because of that." The voices were recorded before any animation was done.

Animation
Anderson said of the production design, "We want to use real trees and real sand, but it's all miniature." Great Missenden, where Roald Dahl lived, has a major influence on the film's look. The film mixes several forms of animation but consists primarily of stop motion. Animation took place in London, on Stage C at 3 Mills Studios, and the puppets were created by Mackinnon & Saunders, with Anderson directing the crew, many of whom animated Tim Burton's Corpse Bride. Selick, who kept in contact with Anderson, said the director would act out scenes while in Paris and send them to animation director Mark Gustafson and the animators via iPhone.

Music
The score for the film was composed by Alexandre Desplat. Jarvis Cocker commented that he wrote "three, four" songs for the film, one of which was included on the soundtrack ("Fantastic Mr. Fox A.K.A. Petey's Song"). The soundtrack also contains a selection of songs by The Beach Boys, The Bobby Fuller Four, Burl Ives, Georges Delerue, The Rolling Stones, and other artists. A soundtrack album for the film was released on November 3, 2009. A second album featuring additional music from the film was released in 2010.

Release

The film had its world premiere as the opening film of the 53rd edition of the London Film Festival on October 14, 2009. 20th Century Fox released it theatrically on November 13, 2009.

Home media
20th Century Fox Home Entertainment released the DVD and Blu-ray on March 23, 2010. The Criterion Collection released the film on Blu-ray and DVD on February 18, 2014.

On streaming, Fantastic Mr. Fox was added on Disney+ in the US and Canada on May 22, 2020.

Reception

Box office
Fantastic Mr. Fox grossed $21,002,919 in the U.S., and $25,468,104 outside the U.S., making a total of $46,471,023 worldwide.

Critical response
On Rotten Tomatoes, the film has an approval rating of 93% based on 245 reviews and an average rating of 7.90/10. The site's consensus states: "Fantastic Mr. Fox is a delightfully funny feast for the eyes with multi-generational appeal – and it shows Wes Anderson has a knack for animation." The film also became the second highest-rated animated film in 2009 on the site, behind Up. On Metacritic, it has a weighted average score of 83 out of 100 based on 34 reviews, indicating "universal acclaim". Audiences polled by CinemaScore gave the film an average grade of "B+" on an A+ to F scale.

Roger Ebert gave the film three and a half stars out of four, writing that, like Willy Wonka & the Chocolate Factory, children may find some aspects of the film perplexing or scary, which he considered a positive element to a children's film. A. O. Scott called Fantastic Mr. Fox "in some ways (Wes Anderson's) most fully realized and satisfying film. Once you adjust to its stop-and-start rhythms and its scruffy looks, you can appreciate its wit, its beauty and the sly gravity of its emotional undercurrents. The work done by the animation director, Mark Gustafson, by the director of photography, Tristan Oliver, and by the production designer, Nelson Lowry, shows amazing ingenuity and skill, and the music (by Alexandre Desplat, with the usual shuffle of well-chosen pop tunes, famous and obscure) is both eccentric and just right." Devin D. O'Leary of Weekly Alibi called it "a one-of-a-kind family classic".

According to Time, the film is "both a delightful amusement and a distillation of the filmmaker's essential playfulness" and was one of the ten best films of the year. Cosmo Landesman of The Sunday Times said "having a quirky auteur like Anderson make a children's film is a bit like David Byrne, of Talking Heads, recording an album of nursery rhymes produced by Brian Eno"; according to Landesman, "in style and sensibility, this is really a Wes Anderson film, with little Dahl. It's missing the darker elements that characterise Dahl's books. There you find the whiff of something nasty: child abuse, violence, misogyny. Gone, too, is any sense of danger. Even the farmers, who are made to look a touch evil, don't seem capable of it. We never feel the tension of watching the Fox family facing real peril. The film certainly has Americanized Dahl's story, and I don't mean the fact that the good animals have American accents and the baddies have British ones. It offers yet another celebration of difference and a lesson on the importance of being yourself. But it does leave you thinking: isn't it time that children's films put children first?"

Amy Biancolli from the Houston Chronicle stated that "Anderson injects such charm and wit, such personality and nostalgia — evident in the old-school animation, storybook settings and pitch-perfect use of Burl Ives — that it's easy to forgive his self-conscious touches."

Ann Hornaday from The Washington Post calls it a "self-consciously quirky movie that manages to be twee and ultra-hip at the same time, it qualifies as yet another wry, carefully composed bibelot in the cabinet of curios that defines the Anderson oeuvre." Peter Howell from the Toronto Star stated that "[i]n an age when everything seems digital, computer-driven and as fake as instant coffee, more and more artists (Spike Jonze and John Lasseter among them) are embracing the old ways of vinyl records, hand-drawn cartoons and painstaking stop-motion character movements." In 2011, Richard Corliss of Time magazine named it one of "The 25 All-Time Best Animated Films".

Awards
The film was nominated for the 2010 Critics Choice Awards for Best Animated Feature, the 2010 Golden Globe Award for Best Animated Feature Film, the 2010 Academy Award for Best Animated Feature and Academy Award for Best Original Score; but ultimately lost all the nominations to Up.

It was also nominated for the Grand Prix of the Belgian Syndicate of Cinema Critics. Alexandre Desplat won Soundtrack Composer of the Year and World Soundtrack of the Year at the 2010 World Soundtrack Awards. On January 14, 2010, the National Board of Review awarded Anderson a Special Filmmaking Achievement award.

After giving his acceptance speech, the audio of the speech was used in a short animation of Anderson's character (Weasel) giving the speech, animated by Payton Curtis, a key stop-motion animator on the film.

References

External links

 
 
 
 Fantastic Mr. Fox: Vulpine Nature an essay by Erica Wagner at the Criterion Collection

2009 films
2009 animated films
2000s American animated films
American children's animated comedy films
Animated films about foxes
Animated films about revenge
American animated films
Films based on works by Roald Dahl
2000s stop-motion animated films
Films about badgers
Films set in 2006
Films set in 2008
Films set on farms
Animated films directed by Wes Anderson
Films scored by Alexandre Desplat
Films with screenplays by Wes Anderson
Films produced by Wes Anderson
Films produced by Allison Abbate
Annecy Cristal for a Feature Film winners
20th Century Fox films
20th Century Fox animated films
Films based on British novels
Indian Paintbrush (production company) films
Regency Enterprises films
Animated films based on novels
Animated films about rats
2000s English-language films